The 1986 Montreal Alouettes finished the season in 3rd place in the East Division with a 4–14 record and missed the playoffs. The Montreal Concordes were renamed the Alouettes following the 1985 season to mark the 40th anniversary of the founding of the Alouettes. The Montreal Alouettes were facing severe financial difficulty, having lost close to $15 million, between 1982–86, so having the CFL giving a fourth place team in one division a playoff spot if its record was better than the third-place finisher in the other division, was a disaster, when Calgary got a playoff spot over the Alouettes, and the lost revenue for a playoff game further crippled the franchise, contributing to its demise shortly after the start of the following season. General manager Joe Galat left the team prior to the end of the season to take a position with the B.C. Lions  on August 1. President Norm Kimball took over as GM until the end of the season

Preseason

Regular season

Standings

Schedule

References

External links
Official Site

Montreal Alouettes seasons
1986 Canadian Football League season by team
1980s in Montreal
1986 in Quebec